Robert Markowitz (born February 7, 1935, in Irvington, New Jersey) is an American film and television director. He directed episodes of Serpico (1976), Delvecchio (1976-1977), and Amazing Stories (1986), and a number of television films that include A Dangerous Life (1988), Too Young to Die? (1990), Decoration Day (1990), Because Mommy Works (1994), Twilight Zone: Rod Serling's Lost Classics (1994) The Tuskegee Airmen (1995), The Great Gatsby (2000), The Big Heist (2001), The Pilot's Wife (2002), and Word of Honor (2003).

His last directing credit was the TNT television film  Avenger (2006), starring Sam Elliott and Timothy Hutton.

Partial filmography
 Avenger (2006) – Made for TV - TNT
 Word of Honor (2003) – Made for TV - TNT
  The Pilot's Wife (2002) – Made for TV - CBS
 The Great Gatsby (2000) – Made for TV - A&E Networks-BBC
 The Tuskegee Airmen (1995) – Made for TV - HBO
 Decoration Day (1990) - Made for TV - NBC
 Too Young to Die? (1990) – Made for TV - NBC
 The Storyteller (1977) -- Made for TV - ABC

References

External links

1935 births
American television directors
Living people
People from Irvington, New Jersey
Film directors from New Jersey